The Highfill-McClure House is a historic house at 701 West Highland Street in Paragould, Arkansas. It is a 1 1/2-story wood-frame structure, finished with a brick veneer.  It is a well-preserved and high-quality example of Craftsman architecture, with a side-gable roof, exposed rafter tails, and a band of decorative brickwork at the basement line. The house was built in 1937 for Claude Highfill, and sold in 1969 to Gary McClure.

The house was listed on the National Register of Historic Places in 2002.

See also
National Register of Historic Places listings in Greene County, Arkansas

References

Houses on the National Register of Historic Places in Arkansas
Houses completed in 1937
Houses in Greene County, Arkansas
National Register of Historic Places in Greene County, Arkansas
Buildings and structures in Paragould, Arkansas